The second Atlanta International Pop Festival was a rock festival held in a soybean field adjacent to the Middle Georgia Raceway in Byron, Georgia, from July 3–5, 1970, although it did not finish until after dawn on the 6th. It was the only successor to the first Atlanta Pop Festival, which had been held the previous summer near Hampton, Georgia. The event was promoted by Alex Cooley, who had helped organize the '69 Atlanta festival as well as the '69 Texas International Pop Festival, and two years later would promote the Mar Y Sol Pop Festival in Puerto Rico from April 1–3, 1972.

History

Like 1969's Woodstock festival, the event was promoted as "three days of peace, love and music." Tickets for the festival were priced at $14. Also like Woodstock, it became a free event when the promoters threw open the gates after large crowds outside began chanting "Free, free, free. Music belongs to the people" and threatened to overwhelm even the biker security crew the promoters had hired.  Crowd estimates for the festival varied widely at the time, and still do, ranging from 150,000 to 600,000.

Construction crews worked at the festival site for over a month prior to the event's opening day building the main stage, two spotlight towers atop soaring tree-trunk tripods, an eight-foot tall plywood fence surrounding the entire 11.7-acre audience seating area, and other facilities.  A separate, much smaller stage – the "Free Stage" - was also built some distance away in a wooded camping area to accommodate impromptu performances by mostly local Georgia musicians who wanted to play during the festival, and many did - including The Allman Brothers Band.  During the construction phase, the band Wet Willie performed for the construction crew but did not perform during the festival itself.  The festival sound system was supplied by Hanley Sound of Medford, Massachusetts, and a rear-projection light show was provided by The Electric Collage of Atlanta, both of which had provided similar services at the first Atlanta Pop Festival the previous summer.

Temperatures at the festival were sweltering, surpassing 100 degrees Fahrenheit every day.  Nudity and drug use were widespread, but local law enforcement officials, who knew they were vastly outnumbered, stayed outside the festival gates and employed a general 'hands-off' policy towards most festival-goers during the event's duration.  However, Georgia's colorful governor, Lester Maddox, who had tried repeatedly to prevent the festival from taking place, vowed that he would do whatever it took to block any similar event in the future. The state legislature willingly complied and enacted sufficient restrictions to make it much more difficult for anyone to organize another rock festival in the state. A third Atlanta Pop Festival never took place.

Performers

Over thirty acts performed on the main stage during the course of the event:

 The Allman Brothers Band
 Ballin' Jack
 Bloodrock
 Bloomsbury People
 Cactus
 Cat Mother & the All Night Newsboys
 Chakra 
 The Chambers Brothers
 Goose Creek Symphony
 Grand Funk Railroad
 Gypsy
 Memphis State University cast of "Hair"
 Hampton Grease Band
 Handle
 Richie Havens
 Hedge & Donna
 The Jimi Hendrix Experience
 It's a Beautiful Day
 Johnny Jenkins
 B.B. King
 Lee Michaels
 Mott the Hoople
 Mountain
 Poco
 Procol Harum
 Radar
 Rare Earth
 Terry Reid
 Rig
 Savage Grace
 John Sebastian
 Bob Seger System
 Spirit
 Ten Years After
 U.S. Kyds
 Johnny Winter

Jimi Hendrix performed at around midnight on the Fourth of July to the largest American audience of his career, presenting his unique rendition of the "Star-Spangled Banner" to accompany the celebratory fireworks display.  The Anunga Runga Tribe of the musical HAIR, which had performed for two weeks in April 1970 on the campus of Memphis State University, were the last act to perform, following Richie Havens, who opened his set at dawn on Monday morning (July 6) with his version of "Here Comes the Sun."

Among the artists billed in various promotional materials and programs but who did not perform at the festival were:  Captain Beefheart, Ginger Baker's Air Force, Taos, Jethro Tull, Ravi Shankar, Country Joe and the Fish, Judy Collins, Rotary Connection, and Sly and the Family Stone.

Audio recordings

Not long after the festival, little-known country singer Paul Wilson recorded a song called "Hippie Invasion" about what he considered to be the seamier side of the festival crowds, which was released on a 45 rpm record by Country Town Records.  In 1971, Savage Grace, one of the bands who performed at the festival, released their second album, Savage Grace 2, which contained "Macon, Georgia", a song they had written about some of their festival experiences.  Also in 1971, Columbia Records released a triple-LP record album called The First Great Rock Festivals of the Seventies, featuring tracks by numerous artists recorded live at both the Second Atlanta International Pop Festival and the Isle of Wight Festival.  Jimi Hendrix's Atlanta Pop Festival performance was recorded and eleven songs from his set were later released as one of the four CDs in a 1991 box set called Stages, a release featuring one live performance from each of the four years of Hendrix's short but high-profile career. In 2003, The Allman Brothers Band released a recording of their festival opening and closing performances, Live at the Atlanta International Pop Festival: July 3 & 5, 1970.  In February 2014, Columbia/Legacy released a 4-CD box set, True to the Blues: The Johnny Winter Story, which features three tracks recorded live at the festival, two of which were previously unreleased. In 2015, a more complete recording of sixteen of the songs in Jimi Hendrix's set, with improved audio quality, was released as a double CD and a separate double vinyl LP package called Freedom: Atlanta Pop Festival.

Festival poster

The promotional poster for the festival was one of three such posters designed by artist Lance Bragg to advertise the three successive pop festivals promoted by Alex Cooley:  the first Atlanta Pop Festival and the Texas International Pop Festival, both in 1969, and the Second Atlanta Pop Festival in 1970 – all of which featured a similar design motif. The posters for both Atlanta festivals are featured in the book The Art of Rock, which states, "The success of large-scale festivals, like the two Atlanta International Pop Festivals… helped create a new image for Southern rock."

Historical marker

On September 15, 2012, a ceremony was held near the site of the festival to unveil and dedicate an official historical marker commemorating the event.  The marker text reads:  "In the 1960s, as American culture changed rapidly, new forms of music and performance emerged, including large outdoor rock festivals.  From July 3–5, 1970, the Second Atlanta International Pop Festival, one of the largest such events anywhere in the world during that era, took place in a field 600 yards west of here. Over thirty musical acts performed, including rock icon Jimi Hendrix playing to the largest American audience of his career, and Macon's Allman Brothers Band on their launching pad to national fame.  Officials estimated that the festival drew several hundred thousand young people to Byron that weekend.  Organized by renowned Atlanta concert promoter Alex Cooley, it remains one of the largest public gatherings in state history."  Official sponsors of the marker were the Georgia Historical Society, the Byron Area Historical Society, the Georgia Allman Brothers Band Association, The Allman Brothers Band Museum at the Big House, and Hittin' the Note.  The marker dedication ceremony was hosted by festival site landowner Tim Thornton, and featured Cooley, Byron Mayor Larry Collins, officials of the sponsoring organizations, and a crowd of festival attendees and fans.

Documentary film

Also on September 15, 2012, the first audience test screening of a full-length documentary film on the festival was held in Macon, GA, by the film's director, Steve Rash.  A second test screening was held two nights later in Atlanta.  On July 30, 2014, two more test screenings were held at the Rock and Roll Hall of Fame in Cleveland, Ohio.  The film features performances by most of the major musical acts appearing during the festival, as well as significant coverage of festival attendees, local residents, and the many other activities that swirled around the festival.  Rash is re-editing the film based on feedback received during the screenings, and plans an eventual public release.

On September 4, 2015, a feature-length documentary on Jimi Hendrix's Atlanta Pop Festival performance, "Jimi Hendrix: Electric Church", was aired on the US cable TV channel Showtime.  The film not only featured substantial live footage of the performance, but interviews with Hendrix's bandmates, other musicians, those who organized the festival and shot the film, and residents of Byron, Georgia. The film was released on Blu-ray and DVD on November 6, 2015.

See also

List of historic rock festivals
List of music festivals

References

External links

Alex Cooley
The Electric Collage light show
Earl McGehee's photos of the Atlanta Pop Festival - 1970
Dennis Eavenson's photos of the 2nd Atlanta Pop Festival
Ric Carter's photos of the 2nd Atlanta Pop Festival
Facebook group on both Atlanta pop festivals
The Strip Project's chronicle of the festival
Hippie Invasion by Paul Wilson – audio file archived at Atlantatimemachine.com

1970s in Atlanta
1970 in American music
1970 in Georgia (U.S. state)
Rock festivals in the United States
Folk festivals in the United States
Hippie movement
Jam band festivals
Pop music festivals in the United States
Music festivals established in 1970
1970 music festivals
July 1970 events in the United States